The Ministry of Justice & Attorney General's Office of Ghana oversees legal matters that pertain to the State's executive power and drafts any legislation accordingly. The Attorney General is responsible for any civil cases and acts as the defendant on behalf of Ghana. The Ministry of Justice was founded in 1951 as a result of the recommendations made by the Lidbury Commission whereas the position of Attorney General originated in 1877. 

The Attorney General is responsible for the Ministry of Justice.

History
The Ministry of Justice was created in 1951 after the Lidbury Commission was established to come up with recommendations upon reviewing the Gold Coast Civil Service. The commission established that the establishment of ministries by the then newly established Gold Coast government, headed by Kwame Nkrumah (then Prime Minister and Head of Government Business), was to be modelled under the British Home Office. A Ministry of Justice was then created and headed by P. F. Branigan, an English expatriate. The ministry was to incorporate the duties of the Attorney General as it oversaw the Attorney General department. The ministry later became the Ministry of Justice and Attorney General. In 1954 when the first all African government was formed in the Gold Coast, the Ministry of Justice did not exist. It was merged with the Ministry of Interior, and the name of the ministry was; Ministry of Interior.
   
In 1956, when a new government was formed following the re-election of Kwame Nkrumah as Prime Minister, the Ministry of Interior became the Ministry of Interior and Justice, and the Ministry was headed by Ebenezer Ako-Adjei, who became the first Ghanaian responsible for the ministry after Ghana gained its independence in March 1957. Following Ghana's independence in 1957, the Ministry of Interior  and Justice was split to form the Ministry of Justice (becoming  a ministry on its own) and the Ministry Interior. This time, the Ministry of Justice did not oversee the Attorney General department as a Ministry for the Attorney General had been created on 7 August 1957 and headed by Geoffrey Bing. Ako-Adjei then became the first Minister of Justice for Ghana from 1957 to 1958. The Ministry was responsible for the functions of the Land Boundaries Settlement Commission, financial and ministerial matters with relation to the Supreme Court, local court and Customary Law, and foreign processes. In 1958, the ministry was merged with the Ministry of Local Government and Kofi Asante Ofori-Atta was put at the helm of its affairs. The Ministry was later split in September 1961 to become its own Ministry when the Ministry of Local Government was merged with the Ministry of Interior and headed by Kwaku Boateng. Ofori-Atta remained Minister for Justice from 1961 until 1965 when he was appointed Speaker of Parliament. The Ministry of Justice was then merged with the ministry for the Attorney General. The portfolio of the Attorney General consequently became; the Minister of Justice and Attorney General. The Ministry was headed by the then Attorney General; B. E. Kwaw-Swanzy. From then onwards to date, the Ministry of the Attorney General has been incorporated with the Ministry of Justice.

List of ministers 

See Attorney General of Ghana

See also 
 Attorney General of Ghana
 Justice ministry
 Politics of Ghana

References 

Justice ministries
Ministries and Agencies of State of Ghana
Attorneys General of Ghana
Justice ministers of Ghana
1954 establishments in Gold Coast (British colony)